The 1997 Coppa Italia Final was the final of the 1996–97 Coppa Italia, the 50th season of the top cup competition in Italian football. The match was played over two legs on 8 and 29 May 1997 between Napoli and Vicenza. The final was won by Vicenza, who claimed their first Coppa Italia title with a 3–1 aggregate victory.

First leg

Second leg

External links

Coppa Italia Finals
Coppa Italia Final 1997
Coppa Italia Final 1997